Hugo Mallo Novegil (born 22 June 1991) is a Spanish professional footballer who plays for and captains RC Celta de Vigo as a right-back.

He has spent his entire career with Celta, making over 400 competitive appearances including a club record of over 300 in La Liga.

Club career
Born in Marín, Pontevedra, Galicia, Mallo played youth football for three local clubs, finishing his development with RC Celta de Vigo. He was immediately inserted in the first-team setup, appearing in 25 Segunda División games in his first season, starting with a 2–1 home loss against CD Numancia on 29 August 2009 in which he came on as a half-time substitute for Roberto Lago. The following 3 April, again from the bench, he was sent off for conceding a penalty kick with a foul on Juan Domínguez which resulted in the only goal of Real Unión's visit to Balaídos.

On 16 October 2010, Mallo scored his first career goal in a 2–2 draw at Villarreal CF B. He started in all 34 matches he appeared in the 2011–12 campaign, as the side finished second and returned to La Liga after five years; he made his debut in the competition on 18 August 2012, in a 0–1 home defeat to Málaga CF.

On 9 January 2013, during a 4–0 Copa del Rey loss at Real Madrid (5–2 aggregate), Mallo – who was not being challenged – suffered an anterior cruciate ligament to his left knee, going on to be sidelined for the rest of the season. He scored his first top-flight goal on 23 May 2015 in the last game of the season, opening the team's account in a 3–2 home win over RCD Espanyol.

Mallo scored in the Galician derby on 23 October 2016, setting Celta up for a 4–1 victory against local rivals Deportivo de La Coruña. He added 12 appearances in a run to the semi-finals of the UEFA Europa League, his debut continental campaign; in the second leg of the last 16, he scored in a 2–0 away defeat of Russia's FC Krasnodar (4–1 aggregate).

On 5 May 2018, Mallo made his 300th competitive appearance in another local derby, putting him sixth in their all-time veterans. That August, he turned down a move to Premier League newcomers Fulham, instead signing a new five-year contract with a buyout clause of €50 million. On 24 November 2019 he moved joint-fourth on the list with a 350th appearance at Villarreal CF, and at 28 he became the youngest player to reach that figure for the club.

By the time that he turned 30 in June 2021, Mallo had beaten Aleksandr Mostovoi's record of 235 top-flight games for Celta. On 15 August that year, his added-time foul on Luis Suárez in a 2–1 home loss to Atlético Madrid caused a brawl which resulted in dismissals for himself, opponent Mario Hermoso and Atléti fitness coach Óscar Ortega. He returned from suspension 13 days later in a 1–0 defeat at the same venue to Athletic Bilbao, his 400th appearance.

International career
Mallo earned three caps for Spain at under-19 level in 2010. In their run to second place at the 2010 UEFA European Championship, he played in the suspended Martín Montoya's absence in the final group game, a 3–0 win against Italy in Flers, Orne.

Julen Lopetegui named Mallo in the under-20 squad for the 2011 FIFA World Cup in Colombia. He played all five games of a quarter-final campaign.

In September 2011, Mallo made his first under-21 appearances in home and away wins over Georgia in European qualification. He then lost his place to Montoya, missed the 2012 Olympics and was edged from even his substitute place under Luis Milla for a year until being recalled against Italy in November 2012, his final international.

Mallo played for the unofficial Galicia team on 20 May 2016, in a 1–1 draw with Venezuela at Riazor.

Career statistics

Honours
Spain U19
UEFA European Under-19 Championship runner-up: 2010

See also
List of one-club men in association football

References

External links

1991 births
Living people
Spanish footballers
Footballers from Marín, Pontevedra
Association football defenders
La Liga players
Segunda División players
RC Celta de Vigo players
Spain youth international footballers
Spain under-21 international footballers